Arrajan castle is a historical castle located in Behbahan County in Khuzestan Province, The longevity of this fortress dates back to the historical Arrajan town of the Sasanian Empire.

References 

Castles in Iran
Sasanian castles
Ancient Roman architecture